KLAZ (105.9 FM) is a radio station broadcasting a Top 40 (CHR) format first broadcasting in 1977.  The station serves the Hot Springs, Arkansas area.  The station was owned by Central Arkansas Radio Group, LLC until December 7, 2016, when it was purchased by US Stations, LLC.

Amy & Friends in the Morning with Amy Hale is KLAZ's morning show.  Micheal is on the air during the midday shift. Jennifer Bailey handles afternoon drive time.

This was the station where nationally syndicated radio host Bobby Bones got his start in radio.

References

External links

LAZ
Contemporary hit radio stations in the United States
Radio stations established in 1977